"How We Do" is a song by American rapper and West Coast hip hop artist the Game, featuring rapper 50 Cent from his debut album, The Documentary. Produced by Dr. Dre, Mike Elizondo, it was released as the album's second official single in late 2004.

"How We Do" achieved commercial success worldwide. The track peaked within the top 10 in multiple countries, including the United Kingdom, Ireland, Netherlands, Switzerland, Germany and New Zealand. The single was commercially successful in the United States, peaking at number 4 on the Billboard Hot 100 and remaining on the chart for 28 consecutive weeks. "How We Do" marked Game's first top-ten single on the chart as a lead artist and also marked 50 Cent's fifth overall top-ten single.

Commercial success
The song was a hit at Urban and Rhythmic radio stations in America, and was a success on American mainstream pop music radio stations. In the U.S., the song debuted at number 65 and peaked at number 4 on the Billboard Hot 100 in early 2005, making it the Game's first top-five hit. The song was also certified Gold by the RIAA.

The song fell down the charts relatively quickly for a top-ten hit. This was likely due to an overabundance of Shady/Aftermath/G-Unit-related singles all competing for airtime during this time period, as Eminem and G-Unit members 50 Cent, Lloyd Banks, Young Buck, and Game all had songs on the chart during the months of late 2004 and early 2005. However, despite its fast fall out of the top twenty, the song managed to hang on in the lower rungs of the top 40 for months, in spite of, or possibly because of, the Game's follow up, "Hate It or Love It" becoming even bigger on pop radio only a few weeks after "How We Do" had peaked. Dr. Dre had produced "How We Do" during his time in G-Unit.

Music video
The music video was directed by Hype Williams; it features cameos by Dr. Dre, Olivia, Michael K. Williams as well as DJ Quik. It showcases night shots of Los Angeles; as well as a Dodge Magnum, driven by the Game, and a Cadillac Escalade, driven by 50 Cent; as it finally cuts to a nightclub.  DJ Quik can be briefly seen towards the end, raising a glass of champagne.

Single track listing

A-side
"How We Do (edited)" (4:03)

B-side
"How We Do (edited)" (4:03) 
"How We Do (explicit)" (4:20) 
"How We Do (instrumental)" (4:04) 
"How We Do (a cappella)" (3:01)

Charts and certifications

Weekly charts

Year-end charts

Certifications

Release history

References

External links

2004 singles
The Game (rapper) songs
50 Cent songs
Song recordings produced by Dr. Dre
Songs written by 50 Cent
Music videos directed by Hype Williams
Songs written by Dr. Dre
Aftermath Entertainment singles
Gangsta rap songs
Songs written by Mike Elizondo
Song recordings produced by Mike Elizondo
2004 songs
Songs written by The Game (rapper)